Kabawetan is a district (kecamatan) of Kepahiang Regency, Bengkulu, Indonesia.

Subdistricts 
 Air Sempiang 
 Babakan Bogor 
 Bandung Baru 
 Bandung Jaya 
 Barat Wetan 
 Bukit Sari 
 Mekar Sari 
 Pematang Donok 
 Sido Makmur 
 Sido Rejo 
 Suka Sari 
 Sumber Sari 
 Tangsi Baru 
 Tangsi Duren 
 Tugu Rejo

Districts of Kepahiang Regency